Eupithecia carpophagata is a moth in the  family Geometridae. It is found in the mountains of Europe, including the eastern Pyrenees, the central and southern part of the Alps, the Massif Central, the central Apennines and the Balkan Peninsula.

The wingspan is about 22 mm.

The larvae feed on Silene species, including Silene cordifolia, Silene saxifraga and Silene rupestris. Larvae can be found from the end of June to September. The species overwinters in the pupal stage.

Subspecies
Eupithecia carpophagata carpophagata
Eupithecia carpophagata benacaria (Dannehl, 1933)
Eupithecia carpophagata cassandrata (Milliere, 1874)

References

Moths described in 1871
carpophagata
Moths of Europe
Taxa named by Otto Staudinger